The Siliguri Corridor, also known as the Chicken's Neck, is a stretch of land around the city of Siliguri in West Bengal, India.  at the narrowest section, this geo-political and geo-economical corridor connects the eight states of northeast India to the rest of India. The countries of Nepal and Bangladesh lie on each side of the corridor and the Kingdom of Bhutan lies at the northern end of the corridor. The Kingdom of Sikkim formerly lay on the northern side of the corridor, until its merging with India in 1975.

The city of Siliguri, in the state of West Bengal, is the major city in this area and the central transfer point that connects Bhutan, Nepal, Bangladesh, Sikkim, Darjeeling, and Northeast India to one another.

History
The partition of India led to the formation of the Siliguri Corridor through the creation of East Pakistan (now Bangladesh) after the partition of Bengal (into East Bengal) in 1947–1948.

The kingdom of Sikkim formerly lay on the northern side of the corridor, until its union with India in 1975 via a publicly held referendum. This gave India a buffer to the north of the Siliguri Corridor and consolidated India's control over the western side of the Chumbi Valley.

Location and dimensions
The dimensions of the corridor are a matter of interpretation.

The corridor is located between Bangladesh to the south-west, Nepal on the northwest, and proximate to Bhutan in the north. Between Sikkim and Bhutan lies the Chumbi Valley, a dagger-like slice of Tibetan territory. The southern end of the Dolam plateau or Doklam triboundary area slopes into the corridor. At the narrowest stretch, the corridor is generally formed by the Mechi River in the east; Nepal's Bhadrapur lies on the banks of the river. Further north the Mechi Bridge connects Mechinagar.

Current situation

Connectivity and logistics
India has embarked on a slew of projects, such as construction of India-China Border Roads and Advance Landing Ground (AGLs), Northeastern India connectivity and Look-East transnational connectivity projects including BIMSTEC and BBIN to create multiple alternatives to Silliguri corridor, including through Bangladesh and the sea.

All land transportation between the rest of India and its far northeastern states uses this corridor. The route has a major broad gauge railway line. Electrification of this double-track corridor is in progress with assistance from Central Organization for Railway Electrification (CORE). Additionally, the old metre gauge line (recently converted to a  broad-gauge line) connects Siliguri Junction with Islampur in North Dinajpur district of West Bengal, via Bagdogra (the only airport of national interest in the corridor) and the bordering towns of Adhikari, Galgalia, Thakurganj, Naxalbari and Taiabpur with Nepal. National Highway 10 connects Siliguri to Guwahati in Assam.

There is no free-trade agreement between Bangladesh and India. The Tetulia Corridor, an alternative to the Siliguri Corridor, is proposed under Article VIII of the India–Bangladesh Trade Agreement 1980, which states that "The two governments agree to make mutually beneficial arrangements for the use of their waterways, railways and roadways for commerce between the two countries and for passage of goods between two places in one country through the territory of the other". However, the proposal is still in the initial stages of negotiation.

Security
India has a number of forces stationed on the borders, the Army and Indo-Tibetan Border Police man the border with China; Sashastra Seema Bal are deployed along the border with Nepal and Bhutan and Border Security Force for Bangladesh. The strip is also patrolled by the Indian Army, the Assam Rifles, and state police forces including the West Bengal Police. The security threat posed by the corridor decreased following the creation of Bangladesh in 1971. Internal threats to the corridor are numerous. Militant groups known to have used the corridor include United Liberation Front of Asom (ULFA) and National Socialist Council of Nagaland (NSCN).

The threat of a Chinese advance is still considered by Indian planners. A Chinese military advance of less than  would cut off Bhutan, part of West Bengal and all of North-East India, an area containing almost 50 million people. This situation arose during the war between India and China in 1962. The security threat to this corridor was heightened during the 2017 Doklam incident. The probability of China cutting off seven states in northeast India has been questioned.

In popular culture
Humphrey Hawksley, in his 2000 novel Dragon Fire, briefly authors a situation where China cuts off India's land route to its northeastern territories. Assassin's Mace (2011) by Brigadier Bob Butalia also involves such a situation involving Doklam and Jaldhaka River.

Notes

Bibliography

Further reading
 
 
 
 
 
 
 
 
 
 
 

Geography of West Bengal
Darjeeling district
Siliguri
Geopolitical corridors
Bangladesh–India border
Bhutan–India border
India–Nepal border